Adriana Romero Henríquez (born 1979 in Bogotá, Colombia) is a Colombian actress. She is the daughter of the late writer Bernardo Romero Pereiro and Judy Henríquez, sister of Jimena Romero and granddaughter of Bernardo Romero Lozano and Carmen de Lugo.

Filmography 
It Was Always Me (2022) TV series .... Wendy
El Clon (2010) TV series .... Luisa
Victoria (2007) TV series .... Valeria
Bluff (2007/I) .... Emilia
Lorena (2005) TV series .... Grethel
La Saga, Negocio de Familia (2004) TV series .... Lucrecia Zapata - Young
El precio del silencio (2002) .... Alma
Hilos invisibles (1998) TV series
La mujer en el espejo (1997) .... Clemencia Santos

References 

Colombian telenovela actresses
Colombian television actresses
1979 births
Living people